Council elections for the City of Preston, Lancashire were held on 22 May 2014 as part of the 2014 United Kingdom local elections. The elections have been moved from earlier on in May to coincide with the North West component of the 2014 European Parliament election. Nineteen electoral wards were fought with those councillors elected in the corresponding elections in 2010 defending their seats due to the "in thirds" system employed in Preston local elections. The previous elections to Preston council occurred in 2012 but due to the "in thirds" system employed by Preston council, councillors are elected for four-year terms. This means gains, losses, and vote share comparisons this year are with those fought in 2010.

All locally registered electors (British, Irish, Commonwealth and European Union citizens) who were aged 18 or over on Thursday 22 May 2014 were entitled to vote in the local elections. Those who were temporarily away from their ordinary address (for example, away working, on holiday, in student accommodation or in hospital) were also entitled to vote in the local elections, although those who had moved abroad and registered as overseas electors cannot vote in the local elections. It is possible to register to vote at more than one address (such as a university student who had a term-time address and lives at home during holidays) at the discretion of the local Electoral Register Office, but it remains an offence to vote more than once in the same local government election.

Election result

Ward results

Brookfield

Cadley

College

Fishwick

Garrison

Greyfriars

Ingol

Larches

Lea

Moor Park

Preston Rural North

Ribbleton

Riversway

Sharoe Green

St George's

St Matthew's

Town Centre
Due to the retirement of Michael Lavellette (Independent Socialist) there will be a double election here, making direct comparisons with the corresponding 2010 election inaccurate.

Tulketh

University

References 

2014
2014 English local elections
2010s in Lancashire